Abacetus bechynei is a species of ground beetle in the family Carabidae.

References 

bechynei
Beetles described in 1956